Mysone Thongsaysy is a Laotian politician. She is a member of the Lao People's Revolutionary Party. She is a representative of the National Assembly of Laos for Houaphanh Province (Constituency 8).

References

Members of the National Assembly of Laos
Lao People's Revolutionary Party politicians
Year of birth missing (living people)
Living people